Hemidactylus albituberculatus is a species of gecko. It is found in the Guinean savanna region of West Africa (Ivory Coast, Ghana, Togo, Benin, and Nigeria) and Cameroon.

Hemidactylus albituberculatus measure  in snout–vent length.

References

Hemidactylus
Geckos of Africa
Reptiles of West Africa
Fauna of Benin
Reptiles of Cameroon
Fauna of Ghana
Fauna of Ivory Coast
Reptiles of Nigeria
Fauna of Togo
Reptiles described in 2012